Christopher Frazine Norton (July 21, 1821 in Fredonia, Chautauqua County, New York – May 6, 1880 in Perry Park, Douglas County, Colorado) was an American politician from New York.

Life
He was the son of James Norton and Polly (Webster) Norton. He attended the district schools and Fredonia Academy. Then he became a clerk in a store. On December 25, 1843, he married Sarah Chase (1821–1870), and they had several children. In 1845, he removed to Erie, Pennsylvania, and engaged in the lumber business. In 1856, he sold his business and removed to Plattsburgh, New York. There he set up a business, getting lumber from the Saranac lakes area, and have it floated down the Saranac River.

He was a member of the New York State Senate (16th D.) in 1870 and 1871.

He was buried at the Riverside Cemetery in Plattsburgh.

Sources
 The New York Civil List compiled by Franklin Benjamin Hough, Stephen C. Hutchins and Edgar Albert Werner (1870; pg. 444)
 Life Sketches of Executive Officers, and Members of the Legislature of the State of New York, Vol. III by H. H. Boone & Theodore P. Cook (1870; pg. 110ff)

External links

1821 births
1880 deaths
Democratic Party New York (state) state senators
People from Fredonia, New York
Politicians from Plattsburgh, New York
Politicians from Erie, Pennsylvania
19th-century American politicians